Low Saxon is a group of Low German dialects spoken in the Netherlands, Lower Saxony and most of Schleswig-Holstein.

Low Saxon or Lower Saxon may also refer to:

Linguistics
 Low German, an Ingvaeonic West Germanic language
 Northern Low Saxon, the dialect spoken in the Northern parts of the Low Saxon language area
 Dutch Low Saxon, a group of Low Saxon dialects recognized as a minority language by the European Union

Other uses 
 Lower Saxon cuisine, a range of regional North German culinary traditions
 Lower Saxon house, a type of German timber-framed house
 Lower Saxon Landtag, the Parliament of Lower Saxony
 Lower Saxon Mill Road, a holiday route that guides visitors to windmills and watermills in Lower Saxony

See also
 Lower Saxony (disambiguation)
 Old Saxon,  the earliest recorded form of Low German
 Upper Saxon, a Central German dialect

Language and nationality disambiguation pages